The 2013 season marked the 106th season in which the Richmond Football Club participated in the AFL/VFL.

2012 off-season list changes

Retirements and delistings

Free agency

Note: Compensation picks are awarded to a player's previous team by the league and not traded from the destination club

Trades

Note: All traded picks are indicative and do not reflect final selection position

National draft

Rookie draft

2013 squad

2013 season

Pre-season 

Note: Round 4 matches were conducted under normal AFL Premiership season rules and did not count towards the NAB Cup Ladder.

Home and away season

Source: AFL Tables

Finals 

Source: AFL Tables

Ladder

Awards

League awards

Rising Star
Nominations:

22 Under 22 team

Brownlow Medal tally

Club awards

Jack Dyer Medal

Michael Roach Medal

References

External links 
 Richmond Tigers Official AFL Site
 Official Site of the Australian Football League

Richmond Football Club seasons
Richmond Tigers